Rustem Agzamovich Khuzin (born 30 January 1972) is a Russian professional football coach and a former player. He is the manager of FC Amkar Perm.

Playing career
He made his professional debut in the Soviet Second League in 1988 for FC Rubin Kazan. He played 1 game in the UEFA Cup 1994–95 for FC Rotor Volgograd.

Honours
 Russian Cup finalist: 1995 (played in the early stages of the 1994/95 tournament for FC Rotor Volgograd).
 Russian Professional Football League Zone Ural-Povolzhye Best Manager: 2015–16.

References

1972 births
Footballers from Kazan
Living people
Soviet footballers
Russian footballers
Association football defenders
Russian Premier League players
FC Rubin Kazan players
FC Rotor Volgograd players
FC Amkar Perm players
FC Amkar Perm managers
FC Neftekhimik Nizhnekamsk managers
Russian football managers
Russian Premier League managers
FC Lada-Tolyatti managers
FC Luch Vladivostok managers